Carolyn Mary Heighway FSA (born 1943) is an archaeological consultant to Gloucester Cathedral and the owner, with her husband Richard Maurice Bryant, of Past Historic, a company which specialises in the design and production of archaeological books and journals as well as exhibitions. She was a founder trustee of Cotswold Archaeology in 1989, and is a fellow of the Society of Antiquaries of London. She is a former president of the Bristol and Gloucestershire Archaeological Society.

Heighway specialises in the archaeology of Gloucester and the Anglo-Saxon period and has written extensively on the subject.

Selected publications

Books
Ancient Gloucester: The story of the Roman and medieval city. Gloucester: Gloucester City Museum, 1976. 
The East Gate of Gloucester. Gloucester: Gloucester City Museum, 1980. 
Gloucester: a history and guide. Gloucester: Alan Sutton Publishing Limited, 1985. 
The Golden Minster: The Anglo-Saxon Minster and Later Medieval Priory of St Oswald at Gloucester, 1999, Council for British Archaeology (co-author)
Gloucester Cathedral – Faith, Art and Architecture: 1000 years. 2011. Scala Books. (With Susan Hamilton)

Articles
"Excavations at Nos. 1 and 30 Westgate Street, Gloucester: The Roman Levels" by Carolyn M. Heighway, Et al. in Britannia, Vol. 11 (1980), pp. 73–114.
"The Roman Tilery at St Oswald's Priory, Gloucester" by Carolyn M. Heighway, Et al. in Britannia, Vol. 13 (1982), pp. 25–77.

References

External links
Carolyn Heighway bibliography.
The Bristol & Gloucestershire Archaeological Society.

1943 births
Living people
British archaeologists
Fellows of the Society of Antiquaries of London
People from Gloucester
Historians of Gloucestershire
British women archaeologists